John Henry Earl (30 November 1822 – 5 February 1874) was an English first-class cricketer active 1849–52 who played for Manchester Cricket Club and Lancashire XIs. The son of John Earl senior, he was born in Manchester and died in Cheetham Hill, Lancashire. Earl made two appearances, his 1849 debut being against a Yorkshire XI at the Hyde Park Ground in Sheffield. His second match was in 1852 for Manchester against Sheffield at the Botanical Gardens Cricket Ground in Manchester. In his two matches he scored a total of 43 runs, with a highest score of 18, and he took two wickets.

References

External links
 

1822 births
1874 deaths
English cricketers
Manchester Cricket Club cricketers
Cricketers from Manchester